The list shown below shows the national football teams of the Soviet Union and the CIS all-time international record against opposing nations. The stats are composed of FIFA World Cup, UEFA European Football Championship and Summer Olympics matches, as well as numerous international friendly tournaments and matches.

All-time records

Results